Botanic railway station serves the Botanic area in south Belfast, Northern Ireland and students for Queen's University Belfast; it is also near Shaftesbury Square which is along Botanic Avenue. It is named after the nearby Belfast Botanic Gardens.

The station opened on 26 April 1976 and is very close to City Hospital Station

Passengers can alight here for the Ulster Museum, which is situated on the edge of Botanic Gardens.

Service

On Sundays, the Bangor, Portadown and Larne Line services all reduce to hourly operation. Derry Line services reduce to two-hourly operation.

At one point, the cross border Enterprise service to Dublin Connolly served Botanic, but no longer stops at the station.

Botanic Gardens
The Botanic Gardens are a short walk away from the station.
 List of parks and gardens in Belfast

References

External links

Railway stations in Belfast
Railway stations opened in 1976
Railway stations opened by NI Railways
Railway stations served by NI Railways
1976 establishments in Northern Ireland
Railway stations in Northern Ireland opened in the 20th century